Wordplay is an American game show which ran on NBC from December 29, 1986 to September 4, 1987. It was hosted by Tom Kennedy, with Jamie Farr substituting for Kennedy for one week of shows, and announced by Charlie O'Donnell. The show was produced by Scotti Vinnedge Television in association with Fiedler/Berlin Productions and Rick Ambrose Television.

When it premiered on December 29, 1986 Wordplay was slotted in the 12:30 pm/11:30 am timeslot following Super Password. That slot had been occupied by the soap opera Search for Tomorrow for over four and a half years on NBC; the serial had aired continuously, first on CBS, since 1951 and was the longest running daytime program in history at the time of its cancellation.

Main game
Two contestants, one usually a returning champion, competed through three rounds to win money by guessing the definitions of unusual words. The gameboard consisted of a 3-by-3 grid of words, with the middle column shifted one level above the others. The contestant in control chose a word, and three celebrity panelists each gave a possible definition with an accompanying humorous anecdote. Panelists were provided with definitions before the show. If the contestant chose the correct definition, he/she won money; an incorrect choice gave the opponent a chance to steal the value with a correct guess.

Two words were played per round, with each contestant choosing one. The champion (or the contestant on the left, if there was no returning champion) played first in round one, the challenger in round two, and the trailing contestant (or, in case of a tie, the left contestant) in round three. Words were worth $25, $50, or $75 in round one; these values doubled in round two, and again in round three. Every word was horizontally and vertically connected to its immediate neighbors. Guessing a correct definition won not only the money for that word, but also the total of all values to which it was connected. For example, a $75 word connected to an already-defined $50 word would award $125 to the contestant who won it ($75 + $50). If a $150 word connected to either of these two values was guessed in a later round, it would award $275 ($150 + $75 + $50). If both contestants missed a word, a block was placed on the board in that location and all connections to it were broken.

One word per game was designated as the day's bonus word. Choosing this word and guessing its definition correctly awarded a bonus prize to the contestant, usually if not always a vacation, which was his/hers to keep regardless of the game's outcome.

The contestant with the higher total after three rounds became the champion, kept his/her accumulated money, and advanced to the bonus round. If the game ended in a tie, a seventh word was played, selected by the champion (or the contestant on the left). Each celebrity gave a brief definition with no accompanying story, and the champion had the option to either play the word or pass it to the challenger. A correct guess won the game, while an incorrect guess gave the victory to the opponent.

Double Definitions
The day's champion advanced to the Double Definitions bonus round for an accumulating cash jackpot. The round was originally titled "Speedword" for the first week, but was quickly changed once the producers realized that fellow NBC game show Scrabble had been using the term for more than two years at the time. The gameboard for this round was a grid of 24 numbered spaces, in four rows of six, with each space vertically and horizontally connected to its immediate neighbors. When the champion called a number, Kennedy read two definitions for a word (such as "Writing Implement/Animal Enclosure" for the word "pen"). Guessing the word awarded control of that space, while passing put up a block that the champion would have to go around. Multiple guesses were allowed with no penalty; the champion could move off a space only by giving a correct response or passing.

The champion had 45 seconds to complete a path connecting the left and right sides of the board. Doing so won the jackpot, which began at $5,000 and increased by $2,500 for every day it went unclaimed. Failing to complete the path won $100 per correct answer. The largest jackpot awarded on the show was $27,500, which occurred during the final week on the air.

Contestants were allowed to stay for three consecutive days or until they were defeated, whichever came first.

Broadcast history
Wordplay premiered on December 29, 1986, three days after the finale of Search for Tomorrow, and inherited the soap opera's 12:30 p.m. Eastern timeslot. The series faced off against the first half-hour of the highly-rated The Young and the Restless on CBS and Loving on ABC, and did not perform well against both soap operas. NBC announced the cancellation of Wordplay in the summer of 1987 in order to make room for Win, Lose or Draw on the network's schedule; the final episode of the series aired on September 4, 1987. Three days after the final episode aired, Scrabble was moved to the 12:30 p.m. Eastern timeslot.

The series exists in its entirety and is in the possession of Fremantle, which inherited the rights to the series from its predecessor company Pearson Television, which in turn acquired those rights through the acquisition of Scotti Vinnedge Productions' parent All American Television.

Prior to 2017, Wordplay had not been seen on television since its cancellation by NBC, but episodes circulated on YouTube through private collectors. Additionally, the series was one of six considered for a Sunday night slot on Buzzr called "Pick & Play" in the fall of 2015, but failed to generate enough votes from viewers to make it on the schedule. The series was later set to begin airing regularly on Buzzr two years later, in September 2017, only to be pulled by the channel after two days and replaced by Match Game.

The pilot episode, shot in October 1986 for NBC, featuring Peter Tomarken as host and Rod Roddy as announcer, also exists. Highlights from the pilot were featured by Wink Martindale as part of his ongoing "Wink's Vault" series on YouTube, and it was later shown in its entirety as part of a Buzzr "Lost and Found" marathon in September 2017. This episode features a different layout for the word grid (a 4-by-3 rectangle with three blocks already in place) and a different theme song. The pilot theme was Hitting Home, composed by British composers David Reilly & John Devereaux and released as part of the KPM Music library.

References

External links
 

1986 American television series debuts
1987 American television series endings
1980s American game shows
English-language television shows
NBC original programming
Panel games
Television series by Fremantle (company)